Claudia O'Doherty (born 29 November 1983) is an Australian actress, writer, and comedian. She won the 2009 Melbourne Fringe Best Comedy Award and the Brisbane Comedy Festival Award for her debut show Monsters of the Deep 3D. O'Doherty co-wrote the books 100 Facts About Pandas and 100 Facts About Sharks with David O'Doherty and Mike Ahern. She was a main cast member in the Netflix TV series Love.

Career
O'Doherty has appeared several times on the podcast Comedy Bang! Bang!, usually playing an exaggerated version of a character also named Claudia O'Doherty. She appeared with "Weird Al" Yankovic, Jimmy Pardo, Nick Kroll, Stars, and Peaches, among others. She also acted on one episode of the Comedy Bang! Bang! TV series.

In 2012, her stand-up show The Telescope was nominated for Best Comedy Show at the Edinburgh Festival Fringe. O'Doherty has appeared on the television show Problems, and in Judd Apatow's film Trainwreck, opposite Bill Hader and Amy Schumer.

In 2014, O'Doherty appeared in The Inbetweeners 2 as an airline rep. In January 2015, she appeared on the British panel show QI alongside Jimmy Carr, Suggs, regular panelist Alan Davies and host Stephen Fry. O'Doherty was a writer for Inside Amy Schumer and also appeared in several episodes. Schumer learned of her when Bill Hader sent Schumer links to O'Doherty's webisode from Channel 4 in the UK.

From 2016 to 2018, O'Doherty appeared in the Netflix series Love. She played the role of Bertie, the new roommate of Mickey, played by Gillian Jacobs.

In 2018, O'Doherty appeared as Amy in The Festival directed by Iain Morris.

In 2022 O’Doherty appeared as Jillian G in the Dan Goor sitcom Killing It. In June 2022 it was announced the series would be renewed for a second season.

Personal life
O'Doherty is from Sydney, Australia, where she attended SCEGGS Darlinghurst and the University of Sydney. At the University, she participated in the Arts Revue and met Nick Coyle and Charlie Garber, with whom she began writing and performing under the name Pig Island. She lives in Los Angeles.

O'Doherty's father is Mental As Anything band member and artist Reg Mombassa (born Chris O'Doherty).

Filmography

Film

Television

References

External links

1983 births
Living people
21st-century Australian actresses
21st-century Australian women writers
21st-century Australian writers
Australian dramatists and playwrights
Australian expatriates in the United States
Australian stand-up comedians
Australian women comedians
Comedians from Sydney